Dianthus is a genus of about 340 species of flowering plants in the family Caryophyllaceae, native mainly to Europe and Asia, with a few species in north Africa and in southern Africa, and one species (D. repens) in arctic North America. Common names include carnation (D. caryophyllus), pink (D. plumarius and related species) and sweet william (D. barbatus).

Description 
The species are mostly herbaceous perennials, a few are annual or biennial, and some are low subshrubs with woody basal stems. The leaves are opposite, simple, mostly linear and often strongly glaucous grey green to blue green. The flowers have five petals, typically with a frilled or pinked margin, and are (in almost all species) pale to dark pink. One species, D. knappii, has yellow flowers with a purple centre. Some species, particularly the perennial pinks, are noted for their strong spicy fragrance.

Species 

Selected species include:

Hybrids include;
 'Devon Xera' – Fire Star Dianthus
 'John Prichard'

Etymology 
The name Dianthus is from the Greek words Δῖος Dios ("of Zeus") and ἄνθος anthos ("flower"), and was cited by the Greek botanist Theophrastus. The color pink may be named after the flower, coming from the frilled edge of the flowers: the verb "to pink" dates from the 14th century and means "to decorate with a perforated or punched pattern". As is also demonstrated by the name of "pinking shears", special scissors for cloth that create a zigzag or decorative edge that discourages fraying.
Alternatively, "pink" may be derived from the Dutch "pinksteren" alluding  to the season of flowering . "Pinksteren" means "Pentecost " in  Dutch. Thus the colour may be named from  the flower rather than the flower from the colour.

Ecology 
Dianthus species are used as food plants by the larvae of some Lepidoptera species including cabbage moth, double-striped pug, large yellow underwing and the lychnis.  Also three species of Coleophora case-bearers feed exclusively on Dianthus; C. dianthi, C. dianthivora and C. musculella (which feeds exclusively on D. superbus).

Cultivation 
Since 1717, dianthus species have been extensively bred and hybridised to produce many thousands of cultivars for garden use and floristry, in all shades of white, pink, yellow and red, with a huge variety of flower shapes and markings. They are often divided into the following main groups:

 Perpetual flowering carnations – grown under glass, flowering throughout the year, often used for exhibition purposes, growing to 
 Old-fashioned pinks – older varieties; evergreen perennials forming mounds of blue-green foliage with masses of flowers in summer, growing to 
 Alpine pinks – mat-forming perennials, suitable for the rockery or alpine garden, growing to 

Over 100 varieties have gained the Royal Horticultural Society's Award of Garden Merit (see the List of Award of Garden Merit dianthus).

Culture 
In the language of flowers, pink Dianthus symbolize boldness.

Dianthus gratianopolitanus – the Cheddar pink – was chosen as the county flower of Somerset in 2002 following a poll by the wild flora conservation charity Plantlife. Dianthus japonicus is the official flower of Hiratsuka, Kanagawa, Japan.

In Japan, Dianthus superbus - the fringed pink or nadeshiko - is used in the term Yamato nadeshiko to describe the archetype of a traditional ideal woman.

Gallery

See also 
 List of Award of Garden Merit dianthus

References

External links 

 The Plant List

 
Caryophyllaceae genera
Saponaceous plants
Taxa named by Carl Linnaeus